Pakka Saharana is a village of the Hanumangarh district in Rajasthan state of western India. The town of Hanumangarh is the district headquarters.

Village profile
The village is located in the extreme north of Rajasthan. The major work of the village is farming; major crops include rice, bajra, cotton, wheat, and vegetables.

Earlier it was in Sri Ganganagar District and then came in Hanumangarh when Hanumangarh was made as district on 12 July 1994 from Sri Ganganagar district because Earlier Hanumangarh was one of the Tehsils of Sri Ganganagar district.
Oriental Bank of Commerce fulfills all the banking needs of the village.

Education
The village has 2 Government Higher Secondary Schools separately for Boys and Girls, one Government Middle School and two Government Primary Schools.
There are also a number of Non Government Schools for Middle, and Secondary Education.

Schools
 Govt. Sr. Secondary School
 Govt. Sr. Secondary School (Girls)
 Govt. Primary School
 Govt. Middle School
 Govt. Primary School, 24 LLW-B
 Vishwa bharti bal mandir Senior Secondary school, 24 LLW-B
 m.d.s Senior Secondary school

Hospitals

 Govt. Primary Health Centre
 Govt. Ayurvedic Health Centre
 Govt. Veterinary Hospital

Language
Bagri, a dialect of Rajasthani language, is spoken by majority of population. Hindi and Punjabi are also in use in this village.

External links

 Full Featured map of Pakka Saharana
 Photos of Pakka Saharana
 Pakka Saharana on Wikimapia

How to Reach
Pakka Saharana is located at 18 km far from Hanumangarh and 42 km. From Sri Ganganagar.
RSRTC provides Public Transit through the village in every 7 Minutes approximately.
Nearest Inter State Bus Terminus in Hanumangarh. The Village has access to the nearest local railway station Hirnawali and Inter State Railway Station is Hanumangarh.
Direct bus services available from most major cities like Delhi, Jaipur, Udaipur, Kota etc. (ask for departing city to Sri Ganganagar via Hanumangarh route.)
One can take direct bus to Delhi, Jaipur, Udaipur, Kota etc. from the village.

References
 Hanumangarh district Official website

Villages in Hanumangarh district